The 2017 HUS football team represented the Hokkaido University of Science in the 2017 JAFA Division 2 football season.

Schedule

Game summaries

Kushiro

HSUH

Muroran Tech

Nodai

References 

American football in Japan